The 1946–47 Serie A season was won by Torino.

Teams
Alessandria had been promoted from the 1945–46 Serie B-C Alta Italia and Napoli had been promoted from the 1945–46 Campionato Centro-Sud Serie A-B.

Events
Following the expansion of the league to 20 clubs, the FIGC originally decided that three teams would be relegated instead of two, as was the case before the league hiatus caused by World War II. However, 20th-placed Triestina would be readmitted for the following season for political reasons.

Final classification

Results

Top goalscorers

References and sources
Almanacco Illustrato del Calcio - La Storia 1898-2004, Panini Edizioni, Modena, September 2005

External links
  - All results on RSSSF Website.

Serie A seasons
Italy
1946–47 in Italian football leagues